Dunton Green is a small village and civil parish in the Sevenoaks District of Kent, England. Dunton Green is designated as being part of the Kent Downs area of outstanding natural beauty, due to its proximity to the North Downs. The original ecclesiastical church parish of Dunton Green was part of Otford parish. The former parish church was dedicated to St John the Divine.

From at least the 17th century, Dunton Green was a centre for making bricks and tiles. In 1862, the Dunton Green Brick, Tile and Pottery Works was established: a large concern with clayholes or pits, kilns and an engine house. While clay was being dug for, many fossils were discovered.

Places of worship
St John the Divine's Church, the Anglican parish church, was designed by M.T. Potter and built in 1889–90 using local bricks.  It was declared redundant in 1987 after congregations declined, and is now in commercial use. The village Anglican church is now St Mary's, Riverhead and its distinctive green copper spire can be seen rising up in the distance from the village.  Dunton Green Free Church opened in 1873 in a building which later became the Bethel Free Church, associated with the Assemblies of God Pentecostal denomination. The Free Church moved to a new building on Station Road, opened in September 1937.  Still with its original name, it remains open and is a member of the Congregational Federation.

Transport 

There are also bus services to central Sevenoaks and surrounding villages. Go Coach routes 3 and 5 serve the village providing links to  Central Sevenoaks with the 3 running to Knockholt, Halstead and Orpington and the 5 running to Sevenoaks Weald and Tonbridge. Dunton Green is not served by buses on weekends, however Go Coach routes 6 and 8 can be caught nearby at Riverhead Tesco down the road. Route 6 provides links to Chipstead and Kemsing whilst route 8 provides local links around Sevenoaks. On Sundays, route 401 operated by Arriva can be caught from Riverhead Tesco and provides links to Westerham and Tunbridge Wells.

Leisure and facilities 
Sevenoaks Information provides a comprehensive What's on events diary for Dunton Green and the surrounding area.

Dunton Green Community Forum and events calendar. Add your own event and discuss local news.

The Dunton Green Social Club offers great entertainment in the village most weekends.

National and regional walking trails pass through the village and there are various local footpaths too.   The Darent Valley Path is accessed from Rye Lane and follows the course of the River Darent from Sevenoaks to Dartford.  There is also a local footpath that follows the north of Chipstead Lake and takes you to Chipstead.  The North Downs Way passes the northern end of the village at London Road.  Heading west will take you along the North Downs to Betsoms Hill, Titsey, and eventually on to Farnham.  Heading east will take you to Otford, up to Wrotham, and eventually on to the White Cliffs of Dover.

Along the London Road there are many shops, businesses, pubs, and restaurants.   The main village arcade is situated between Dunton Green Primary School and Lennard Road.  There are three pubs; The Miners Arms, The Dukes Head, and The Rose and Crown – all are situated along the London Road.

The nearest local Library is in Riverhead and is run by Kent County Council; it has specific week day hours of opening.  You can order library items online for collection and there are telecottage facilities available.

Digital television has been available for aerials pointing east in Dunton Green since 2006 from the Blue Bell Hill Transmitter for Kent & Sussex TV transmissions, which is also now broadcasting in HD.

Nearest settlements

See also
List of places of worship in Sevenoaks (district)

References

Works cited

External links
 

Civil parishes in Kent
Sevenoaks
Villages in Kent